Milan Obradović (born 27 December 1999) is a Serbian professional footballer who plays as a defender.

He made his Serbian Super Liga debut with FK Napredak Kruševac in March 2019.

References

1999 births
Living people
Serbian footballers
Association football defenders
FK Napredak Kruševac players
Wisła Płock players
Serbian SuperLiga players
Ekstraklasa players
Serbian expatriate footballers
Expatriate footballers in Poland
Serbian expatriate sportspeople in Poland